The Esplanade Reserve in Perth, Western Australia was a heritage listed public space between Perth Water and the Perth central business district. It formed part of, and was occasionally referred to incorrectly as, the Perth foreshore and the Perth waterfront. The public space was resumed by the Western Australian state government in April 2012 as part of the Elizabeth Quay redevelopment of the Perth waterfront area.

Established in 1880 on land reclaimed from the Perth Water northern shore between the William Street and Barrack Street jetties, adjacent hotels, railway stations and other features have used the term Esplanade to show their link to the space. The road along the northern boundary of that space is still, called The Esplanade.

History
The Perth Water northern edge from Mount Eliza in Kings Park to The Causeway has been extensively modified by landfill along the original pre-European river shore. Many projects and constructions on the Esplanade area and adjacent areas have significantly reflected the changing identity of Perth.

The Esplanade was developed in the 1870s to provide a site of active recreation for the inhabitants of the city. The idea of a site closer to the administrative and residential heart of the city had been a matter of concern since at least 1864, when a fund for the establishment of a new recreation ground was established. A recreation ground, now Wellington Square, was included in the original town plan, but was considered too far for most people to walk to and was largely undeveloped. Around 1867–1868 stones were placed in the river to mark out the edge of the reclamation but little other work was undertaken until 1870. Between 1870 and 1878 reclamation was undertaken using mud dredged up from the river bottom (dredging was used to provide crushed oyster shell for marking out roads and pathways) and street sweepings.

It was handed to the City of Perth in 1880 as a Crown Grant in Trust "for the inhabitants of Perth for recreation purposes forever".

Since its handover to the City of Perth, it has been the site of many celebrations, protests and national commemorations.

The first major event held on the Esplanade was the 1881 Intercolonial Exhibition, organised by Richard Twopenny and Jules Joubert. Joubert, who spent several months in the city to develop and oversee the exhibition, recommended a city baths, and in 1885 the first Perth City Baths were established at the end of the Esplanade Reserve.

The Perth Bowling Club green was established directly across from the Esplanade Hotel in 1895, and the green and players appear regularly in the images created to promote the hotel in later years.

At various stages in its history, the Esplanade was a suggested site of various ideas, even a new town hall.

Adjoining features

Notes

References

Parks in Perth, Western Australia
Barrack Street, Perth
Elizabeth Quay
The Esplanade (Perth)
State Register of Heritage Places in the City of Perth